"H.A.P.P.Y. Radio" is a 1979 disco song recorded by soul singer Edwin Starr.

Starr's previous release, "Contact", had proved to be his best showing on the US Pop Charts (and R&B Charts) in several years. It was also a huge hit in Britain, making it into the Top Ten and peaking at #6 on the UK Singles Chart. This song was issued as its follow-up, and although less successful, still made all three charts. "H.A.P.P.Y. Radio" peaked at #79 on the Hot 100 and #28 on the R&B Charts, but was a much bigger hit in the UK, where it was a Top Ten hit (#9) in mid-1979. The song was both written and produced by Edwin Starr himself.

Reception
Smash Hits said, "Edwin knows what his British fans want to hear better than most other Americans and it sounds as if he's got the formula right again with this boisterous chuck of disco-mix, which is like a cross between "Contact" and one of his earliest hits "Headline News"."

Charts

Other versions
Starr later re-recorded the song as part of Ian Levine's Motorcity Records project, along with many of his previous Ric-Tic and Motown songs.
In 1989 the British singer Michaela released a cover version of the song which reached #62 on the UK charts.

References

1979 singles
1979 songs
Disco songs
Edwin Starr songs
Songs written by Edwin Starr
20th Century Fox Records singles